Kevin Ellis (born June 29, 1973), is an American skeleton racer who competed from 1999 to 2006. He finished 17th in the men's skeleton event at the 2006 Winter Olympics in Turin.

Ellis also finished sixth in the men's skeleton at the 2003 FIBT World Championships in Nagano. See results list below.

Prior to competing in skeleton, Ellis competed for Stephen F. Austin State University in athletics. He is also an accountant in Dallas, Texas

DATE

References
 2006 men's skeleton results
 FIBT profile
 Skeletonsport.com profile
 ssolympicteam.com profile

External links
 

1973 births
Living people
Sportspeople from Killeen, Texas
American male skeleton racers
Olympic skeleton racers of the United States
Sportspeople from Dallas
Skeleton racers at the 2006 Winter Olympics
Stephen F. Austin State University alumni
20th-century American people
21st-century American people